In religion, a covenant is a formal alliance or agreement made by God with a religious community or with humanity in general. The concept, central to the Abrahamic religions, is derived from the biblical covenants, notably from the Abrahamic covenant. Christianity asserts that God made an additional covenant through Jesus Christ, called the "new covenant".

A covenant in its most general sense and historical sense, is a solemn promise to engage in or refrain from a specified action. A covenant is a type of agreement analogous to a contractual condition. The covenantor makes a promise to a covenantee to do (affirmative covenant) or not do some action (negative covenant).

Biblical

Covenant is the customary word used to translate the Hebrew word berith. It is used in the Masoretic Text 264 times.

Judaism

The Mosaic covenant refers to a biblical covenant between God and the biblical Israelites. The establishment and stipulations of the Mosaic covenant are recorded in the first five books of the Hebrew Bible, which are traditionally attributed to Mosaic authorship and collectively called the Torah, and this covenant is sometimes also referred to as the Law of Moses or Mosaic Law or the 613 Mitzvot.

Covenants are often initiated by an oath and can be of two types: grants or treaties. Grants are generally unilateral, unconditional covenants such as those where God made unconditional promises to Noah (Genesis 9), Abraham (Genesis 15, Genesis 17) and David (2 Samuel 7:8ff). Bilateral covenants are generally conditional with blessings for obedience and curses for disobedience as in Deuteronomy 28 and 30.

Christianity

Biblical theology and systematic theology for covenants often intertwines the unilateral and the bilateral, the conditional and the unconditional, such that much has been written and said about "Old" and "New" Covenants and the extent to which the "Old Covenant" still persists.  The typology of covenants is governed by the distribution of covenant obligations between the covenanting parties.

The New Covenant is a biblical interpretation derived partly from a phrase in the Book of Jeremiah, (Jeremiah 31:31), in the Hebrew Bible. There are several Christian eschatologies that further define the New Covenant. For example, an inaugurated eschatology defines and describes the New Covenant as an ongoing relationship between Christian believers and God that will be in full fruition after the Second Coming of Christ; that is, it will not only be in full fruition in believing hearts, but in the future external world as well. The connection between the blood of Christ and the New Covenant is seen in most modern English translations of the New Testament with the saying: "this cup that is poured out for you is the new covenant in my blood".

Christians believe that Jesus is the mediator of the New Covenant, and that the blood of Christ shed at his crucifixion is the required blood of the covenant. As with all covenants between God and man described in the Bible, the New Covenant is considered "a bond in blood sovereignly administered by God." It has been theorized that the New Covenant is the Law of Christ as spoken during his Sermon on the Mount.

Covenant theology, a theological system within Reformed Christianity, holds that God relates to man primarily through three covenants: the Covenant of Redemption, the Covenant of Works, and the Covenant of Grace. In this theological system a covenant may be defined as, "an unchangeable, divinely imposed legal agreement between God and man that stipulates the conditions of their relationship."

Methodism

In historic Methodism, those who become full members of Methodist congregation are bound to a covenant. In the Allegheny Wesleyan Methodist Connection, those probationers entering into the Church as full members are read the following covenant:

The Emmanuel Association of Churches, a Methodist denomination in the conservative holiness movement, uses the following Covenant:

Methodists connexions, such as those of the Free Methodist Church, United Methodist Church and Pilgrim Holiness Church, traditionally celebrate a watchnight service that takes the form of a Covenant Renewal Service annually on New Year's Eve, in which members renew their covenant with God and the Church. In the Immanuel Missionary Church, a Methodist connexion in conservative holiness movement, those who repeatedly do not partake of the means of grace may be excluded from church membership if they do not "repent and amend".

Moravianism
The Moravian Covenant for Christian Living is taken by members of the Moravian Church that delineates their commitment as Christians.

Latter Day Saints

In the Latter Day Saint movement, a covenant is a promise made between God and a person or a group of people. God sets the conditions of the covenant, and as the conditions are met, he blesses the person who entered into and kept the covenant. If the covenant is violated, blessings are withheld and in some cases a penalty or punishment is inflicted.

The Church of Jesus Christ of Latter-day Saints (LDS Church) teaches that one enters a covenant through a ritual or a visible sign. Some leaders have taught that a covenant is always associated with an ordinance. Other leaders have suggested that commandments that include promised blessings for compliance—such as the law of tithing and Word of Wisdom—also constitute covenants.

In the LDS Church, ordinances which are accompanied by covenants include baptism and confirmation; partaking of the sacrament; reception of the Melchizedek priesthood; the temple endowment; and celestial marriage. These are known as "saving ordinances" and are a requirement for exaltation.

Officially, partaking of the sacrament is considered by the LDS Church to be a renewal of the covenants made at baptism; however, some Latter-day Saint leaders have taught that doing so constitutes a renewal of all covenants a person has made.

Islam
The original covenant made between God and mankind marked the beginning of creation according to Islamic theology. It is believed that before the creation of the heavens and the earth, God assembled all of creation (that would ever exist) in a timeless, placeless region and informed them of the truth of his existence. This moment is referred to in the verse 7:172 of the Quran as follows:

And ˹remember˺ when your Lord brought forth from the loins of the children of Adam their descendants and had them testify regarding themselves. ˹Allah asked,˺ “Am I not your Lord?” They replied, “Yes, You are! We testify.” ˹He cautioned,˺ “Now you have no right to say on Judgment Day, ‘We were not aware of this.’

This covenant is significant in that it asserts that an understanding of the origin of man is something deeply inherent to and natural within every person. Any disconnection from this memory is referred to as being ‘forgetful’ within the scripture, hadith literature and commentary. The Quran constantly implores people to recall and remember. Scholars suggest that the call to remember throughout the Quran is in fact a call to remember this particular moment in their spiritual history. Suggestions are also made that where people recognise people with ease, it is usually as a memory from this event. To strive to remember through invocations and contemplation is thus considered a form of worship in Islam called dhikr.

There are many scholarly perspectives taken on the significance of this covenant. It is understood as marking the beginning of human consciousness with mankind making their first conscious response to the divine question 'Am I not your lord?'. Some also see it as being relevant to the Islamic principle of Tawhid or unity as the entirety of mankind was said to have been assembled on this date.

Another perspective is that as an Abrahamic faith, the covenant was made with Abraham. Any person confessing to faith can become a Muslim and partake of this covenant with God: 

Gerhard Bowering has written about the mystical aspects of the Covenant in Islam.

Bahá'í Faith  
In the Bahá'í Faith, a religious covenant is considered a binding agreement between God and humans wherein a certain behavior is required of individuals and in return God guarantees certain blessings. For Bahá'ís there are two distinct covenants: a Greater Covenant which is made between every prophet or messenger from God and his followers concerning the next divine teacher to come; and a Lesser Covenant that concerns successorship of authority within the religion after the prophet dies.

According to Bahá'u'lláh, the founder of the Bahá'í Faith, in the greater covenant God promises to always send divine teachers to instruct humankind in a process known as progressive revelation. Bahá'ís believe prophecies pertaining to God's greater covenant are found in the scriptures of all religions, and each messenger from God specifically prophesies about the next one to come. For their part in the greater covenant, the followers of each religion have a duty to investigate with an open mind whether a person who claims to be the promised messenger of their faith does, or does not, spiritually fulfill relevant prophecies.

To differentiate it from God's eternal greater covenant with humankind, Bahá'ís refer to a manifestation's agreement with his followers regarding whom they should turn to and obey immediately after his passing as the lesser covenant. Two distinctive features of the Bahá'í lesser covenant, which is referred to within the Bahá'í Faith as the Covenant of Bahá'u'lláh, are that it is explicit and also conveyed in authenticated written documents. Bahá'ís consider Bahá'u'lláh's covenant as unique in religious history, and the most powerful means for ensuring the spiritual health of the Faith's adherents, and their enduring unity and complete protection from any efforts to foment dissension or to create schism.

Other religions
In Indo-Iranian religious tradition, Mithra-Mitra is the hypostasis of covenant, and hence keeper and protector of moral, social and interpersonal relationships, including love and friendship. In living Zoroastrianism, which is one of the two primary developments of Indo-Iranian religious tradition, Mithra is by extension a judge, protecting agreements by ensuring that individuals who break one do not enter Heaven.

See also
 Christian views on the Old Covenant 
 Covenantal theology (Roman Catholic)
 Covenant (law)

References

Religious belief and doctrine
Religious terminology